Rick Cluff (born 1950) is a Canadian journalist who hosted the CBC Radio Vancouver morning program The Early Edition from 1997 until 2018. He is a member of the Canadian Football Hall of Fame and recipient of the Lifetime Achievement Award from the Canadian Radio Television Digital News Association.

Early life and education
Cluff was born in Toronto, Ontario. His father was a former air force radio host, performer, and record producer in Toronto. After being kicked out of school in Grade 10, Cluff attended college as a mature student. He attended Seneca College and the University of Western Ontario where he worked on their student radio stations. After attending graduate school, he earned a position with the CBC.

When Cluff began working at Seneca's student radio show, his father discouraged him for thinking of radio as a career. He was especially vehemently opposed to CBC "because the CBC is full of left-wing communists. And radio is a dead-end career."

Career

Cluff began his career at CBC in 1976 as a radio journalist focusing on sports. As a sports journalist, he covered eight Olympic games, and five Commonwealth games. Cluff was sent as a reporter during the 1996 Summer Olympics in Atlanta, where he reported for two hours on the Centennial Olympic Park bombing with limited preparations. Upon his return, the  vice presidents of CBC asked him if he would host his own show. He was later asked by Susan Englebert to take up a three-year position in Vancouver as host of The Early Edition, which was later extended.

Cluff began his 20-year career as host of The Early Edition in September 1997. He was also one of the few journalists allowed to enter Moscow and Prague during the World Hockey Championships at the time of the Cold War. In 1999, he was inducted into the Canadian Football Hall of Fame.

In June 2017, before announcing his retirement, Cluff underwent open-heart surgery after living with hereditary heart disease. In December 2017, it was announced that Stephen Quinn would replace Cluff. In 2018, he was the recipient of the Lifetime Achievement Award from the Canadian Radio Television Digital News Association.

Personal life
Cluff and his wife have two children together.

References 

1950 births
Living people
Canadian talk radio hosts
Canadian sports journalists
Journalists from Toronto
Seneca College alumni
University of Western Ontario alumni